= Single-chamber =

Single-chamber may refer to:

- Single-chamber government, a government having only one legislative or parliamentary chamber
- Single-chamber pacemaker, a pacemaker in which only one pacing lead is placed into a chamber of the heart
